The  EMD F40PH is a four-axle  B-B diesel-electric locomotive built by General Motors Electro-Motive Division in several variants from 1975 to 1992. Intended for use on Amtrak's short-haul passenger routes, it became the backbone of Amtrak's diesel fleet after the failure of the EMD SDP40F. The F40PH also found widespread use on commuter railroads in the United States and with Via Rail in Canada. Additional F40PH variants were manufactured by Morrison-Knudsen and MotivePower between 1988 and 1998, mostly rebuilt from older locomotives.

Amtrak retired its fleet of F40PHs in the early-2000s in favor of the GE Genesis, but the locomotive remains the mainstay of Via Rail's long-distance trains; a depiction of the locomotive hauling The Canadian is featured on the reverse of the Frontier series Canadian $10 bill. The F40PHs are still a common sight on many other commuter railroads throughout the United States. In addition, Amtrak has kept 22 of its F40PHs in use as non-powered control units.

Background
Amtrak inherited an aging and mechanically-incompatible fleet of diesel locomotives from various private railroads on its startup in 1971. The most modern locomotives remained in private hands for freight service, or to operate the various commuter services which, by law, did not pass to Amtrak. To replace these Amtrak ordered 150 EMD SDP40F locomotives, which began entering service in 1973. These were supplemented by 25 GE P30CHs which entered service in 1975. The SDP40F was a troubled design; problems with weight distribution led to a series of derailments in the mid-1970s. Meanwhile, the poor truck design of the P30CH (and the electric GE E60CP) curtailed further orders of that unit when Amtrak found itself needing more short- and medium-distance power in the spring of 1975.

Design

The design of the F40PH was based on the EMD GP40-2 freight road-switcher and shared that locomotive's turbocharged EMD 645E3 V16 cylinder, two-stroke, water-cooled diesel engine (prime mover). The prime mover developed  at 893 RPM. The main (traction) generator converts mechanical energy from the prime mover into electricity distributed through a high voltage cabinet to the traction motors. Each of the four traction motors is geared to a pair of driving wheels; the gear ratio determines the maximum speed of the locomotive. The first 30 locomotives were built with a  fuel tank. Subsequent units were built with a  tank. Beginning with the EMD F40PH-2, introduced in 1985, the prime mover developed . Many of the original F40PHs were updated to match that output. A standard F40PH weighs .

For passenger service the F40PH has another electrical alternator, the head-end generator. The HEP unit generates three-phase AC power at 480 V (500 kW on the first order, 800 kW on later units) for lighting, heating and air-conditioning the train. Originally, F40PHs powered the HEP alternator from the prime mover. As a result of that, the train had to be at a constant 60Hz frequency, and the prime mover had to turn at a constant 893 RPM while supplying head end power (even standing still, with the throttle in idle). Power to the traction motors was controlled by varying the field excitation of the main (traction) generator. On some later versions of the F40PH (and on many rebuilt F40s), a second small auxiliary diesel engine at the rear of the locomotive powers the HEP alternator. In these engines, the prime-mover speed varies in the usual way. They can be identified by the diesel exhaust at the rear of the locomotive and by their quiet idle. Remaining F40s, with the constant-RPM prime movers, are noticeably louder.

In the initial design the battery box and air reservoirs were located forward of the fuel tank. In locomotives manufactured after 1977 these were relocated behind the tank. The battery box returned to its original location in the F40PH-2. The F40PH-2s delivered to Caltrain incorporated Southern Pacific Railroad-style headlights.

The designation "F40PH" stood for the following: "F" for the full-width cowl carbody, "40" as the locomotive is part of EMD's 40-series (based on the GP40-2 freight locomotive), "P" for passenger service, and "H" for head-end power.

History

Amtrak ordered its first 30 F40PHs on May 8, 1975; the first of the new locomotives entered service on April 9 the following year. Amtrak intended the locomotives for short routes such as the San Diegan in California and Northeast Corridor services in the then non-electrified portion between New Haven, Connecticut and Boston, Massachusetts. The long-distance routes were protected by the then-new EMD SDP40F, described by J. David Ingles in late 1975 as the "stars of Amtrak's long-distance trains". Two events led to a major change in thinking within Amtrak. The first was a sharp decline in the mechanical reliability of the EMD SDP40F, including several derailments. The second was the unusually harsh winter of 1976–1977, which sidelined many of Amtrak's aging steam-heated coaches. Amtrak suspended numerous routes and pressed the new HEP-equipped Amfleet I coaches, designed for short runs, into service. The F40PH, with its built-in HEP generator, was the natural choice to haul these trains.

As problems with the EMD SDP40F mounted, Amtrak adopted the F40PH as its long-term solution nationwide for diesel service. In the spring of 1977 Amtrak traded 40 SDP40Fs back to EMD; components including the prime mover were installed into an F40PH's frame. The 40 rebuilt locomotives were designated F40PHR and were identical to new-build F40PHs, incorporating the larger fuel tank and more powerful HEP generator which had become standard. Amtrak ultimately acquired 132 F40PHRs in this manner, which combined with new orders between 1975 and 1988, and the purchase of six GMD F40PHs from GO Transit in 1990, led to a fleet of 216 locomotives, the country's largest fleet.

The first commuter rail operator to order F40PHs was Chicago's Regional Transportation Authority (RTA), a forerunner to Metra, who ordered 74 between 1977 and 1983. Metra ordered 41 more between 1988 and 1992. Other agencies who bought the F40PH included the Massachusetts Bay Transit Authority (MBTA) (18), Caltrain (20), GO Transit (6), New Jersey Transit (17), and Via Rail (59). Finally, the rail construction firm Speno ordered four. In total EMD built 449 locomotives, including the F40PHR trade-ins.

The F40PH performed well for Amtrak; at the start of the 1990s only four had been retired due to wrecks and the locomotive was at the center of Amtrak's advertising. Trains magazine estimated that on average, each F40PH traveled as many as  a year. Amtrak began replacing the F40PH with the GE Dash 8-32BWH in 1991, the GE P40DC in 1993 and the GE P42DC in 1996. All were retired by 2001 with the arrival of the last P42DC and their last regular assignment was on the Maple Leaf in December 2001. The Panama Canal Railway acquired several ex-Amtrak F40PHs for both freight and passenger service; the 480V head-end power matched the voltage used by the refrigeration in Maersk Sealand containers.

The F40PH has continued to serve Via Rail into the 21st century; between 2007 and 2012 Via refurbished its entire fleet for CAD $100 million. The rebuild program included separate HEP generators, overhauled engines, a 3rd headlight addition, cab reconditioning, additional safety horns at the front, and repainting into the newer VIA scheme. A rebuilt locomotive, No. 6403, pulling the Canadian through the Rocky Mountains, was included on the back of the redesigned Canadian ten-dollar note in 2013 (the actual 6403 was later renumbered to 6459). As of 2018, VIA has 53 such locomotives in service. These locomotives are now supplemented by GE P42DC locomotives delivered in 2001.

Three ex-Amtrak F40PHs have been preserved: No. 231 is owned by Dynamic Rail Preservation in Boulder City, Nevada, No. 281 is at the California State Railroad Museum, and No. 307 is at the North Carolina Transportation Museum. Coaster donated two of its F40PHM-2C locomotives that were retired on February 8, 2021; 2103 was donated to the Pacific Southwest Railway Museum, and 2105 to the Southern California Railway Museum.

Variants 

The longevity of the F40PH has led to numerous conversions, rebuildings, and remanufacturings. In some instances new locomotives were assembled using EMD components. Several transit agencies lengthened their locomotives to include a separate HEP generator. These were designated F40PH-2C and F40PH-CAT where Cummins and Caterpillar generators were used, respectively. The F40PH-2C was considerably heavier than the standard design, weighing . The F40PH-2D, employed by Via Rail, had special customizations for operating in Canada, including ditch lights. Metra's last 30 locomotives, designated F40PHM-2 (now rebuilt as F40PHM-3), were built with a sloped cab similar to the experimental EMD F69PHAC. The streamlined appearance acquired the nickname "Winnebago." The five EMD GP40 locomotives Morrison-Knudsen rebuilt for Tri-Rail in 1988 were designated F40PHL-2. Progress Rail rebuilt 41 Metra units with remanufactured engines, rebuilt traction motors and microprocessor traction control. These have been designated the F40PH-3. The MBTA's dozen F40PHM-2C locomotives were built new using EMD components, as were the six F40PH-3 locomotives of the Altamont Commuter Express.

As Amtrak's F40PH fleet was replaced by newer GE Genesis-series locomotives, Amtrak converted a number of the retired units into baggage/cab cars. Colloquially known as "cabbages" (a portmanteau of "cab" and "baggage"), and officially known as Non-Powered Control Units (NPCUs), these units had their diesel engines, traction motors, and main alternators removed, as well as a large roll-up door installed in the side (allowing the former engine compartment to be used for baggage). Amtrak converted 22 locomotives into cabbage cars between 1996 and 2007. Each converted unit was renumbered by prefixing "90" to its original number. In 2011, Amtrak converted F40PH No. 406 to an NPCU to enable push-pull operation of Amtrak's 40th-anniversary exhibit train; in addition, a HEP generator was installed to supply auxiliary power. Unlike other NPCUs, No. 406 retains its original number (instead of being renumbered to 90406) and resembles an operational F40PH externally.

Some F40PHs found their way into freight service, after suitable modifications. It was also fitted with a door, platform, and steps at the front. One unit, 450, was acquired by Western Maryland Scenic Railroad in 2018.

Original owners 

Electro-Motive Division manufactured 475 F40PHs of all types between 1975 and 1992. The orders for GO Transit and Via Rail Canada were built by General Motors Diesel (GMD), the company's Canadian subsidiary. Morrison-Knudsen and its successor MotivePower remanufactured another 31 locomotives between 1988 and 1998.

See also 
 List of GM-EMD locomotives
 List of GMD Locomotives

Notes

Footnotes

References

External links

 EMD F40PH Data Sheet

F40PH
F40PH
Amtrak locomotives
F40PH
Via Rail locomotives
Passenger locomotives
Diesel-electric locomotives of the United States
Railway locomotives introduced in 1975
B-B locomotives
Standard gauge locomotives of Canada
Standard gauge locomotives of the United States